The MIT Center for International Studies (CIS) is an academic research center at the Massachusetts Institute of Technology. It sponsors work focusing on international relations, security studies, international migration, human rights and justice, political economy and technology policy. The center was founded in 1951.

According to its website, CIS aims "to support and promote international research and education at MIT".

History
The MIT Center for International Studies was one of several academic research centers founded in the United States after World War II. Its creation was originally funded by the Central Intelligence Agency (CIA), in order to provide expert analysis on issues pertaining to the Cold War rivalry with the Soviet Union.

Prominent social scientists involved with CIS include Lucian Pye, Eugene Skolnikoff, William Kaufmann, Walt Rostow, Ithiel de Sola Pool, Carl Kaysen. Early on, the center specialized in political and economic development, military strategy, and Asia, and many of its faculty (e.g. Rostow and Kaysen) served in high government posts. Daniel Ellsberg was a research fellow at CIS when he released the Pentagon Papers in 1971.

Programs

The Security Studies Program (SSP), a joint program with the department of political science, was established in the 1970s. Many prominent security specialists in government, think tanks, the military and academia, including Geoffrey Kemp, Daniel Byman, Ken Pollack, and William Durch, undertook their doctoral studies in SSP. Since the early 1990s, it has been associated with the Neorealist school of international relations, led by such theorists as Barry Posen and Stephen Van Evera.

The MIT International Science and Technology Initiative (MISTI) is a novel program in applied international studies. MISTI has placed 7,233 students around the globe from 1983 to 2015. In the 2014–2015 academic year, 880+ students participated. 31% of MIT students who graduated in 2015 participated in MISTI at some point during their MIT experience. Of these MISTI students, 27% participated in MISTI more than one time.

The center organizes Seminar XXI, a yearly educational program for senior military officers, government and NGO officials, and other leaders in U.S. national security policy.

In 2015, the MIT Center for International Studies established the MIT International Policy Lab (IPL), whose mission is “to enhance the impact of MIT research on public policy, in order to best serve the nation and the world in the 21st century.” The Policy Lab will award up to $10,000 to faculty and research staff with principal investigator status who wish to convey their research to policymakers.

The center also has programs in international political economy, particularly the MIT Program on Emerging Technologies (POET), a National Science Foundation awardee. Other programs include:
Bustani Middle East Seminar
International Migration and Humanitarian Studies 
Persian Gulf Initiative 
Program on Emerging Technologies  
International Policy Lab 
 South Asian Politics 

Several visiting fellows and scholars join the center each year, including outstanding women journalists under the Elizabeth Neuffer Fellowship, and distinguished public servants under the Robert E. Wilhelm Fellowship. Other individuals have spent weeks or months at the center, such as Ranil Wickremasinghe, former prime minister of Sri Lanka; David Miliband, former foreign secretary of the U.K.; and Fatemeh Haghighatjoo, a former reform member of the Majlis of Iran.

Leadership and faculty
CIS includes 160 members of the MIT faculty and staff, mainly drawn from the departments of political science and urban studies, and visiting scholars from around the world.

Administration:
 Richard J. Samuels, director and Ford International Professor of Political Science
 John Tirman, executive director and principal research scientist
Stephen Van Evera, associate director and professor of political science

Partial list of faculty:
Barry Posen, Ford International Professor of Political Science, director, Security Studies Program
Kenneth A. Oye, associate professor of political science and engineering systems design; former director, CIS; director, MIT Program on Emerging Technologies
Francis Gavin, Stanton Professor of Political Science
Taylor Fravel, associate professor of political science
 Vipin Narang, associate professor of political science
 Fotini Christia, associate professor of political science
 Owen Cote, senior research scientist
 Jim Walsh, research scientist

Wilhelm Fellows 
 Naomi Chazan, 2004, former Deputy Speaker of the Knesset, Israel
 Francis Deng, 2005, Under Secretary General of the United Nations, former Foreign Minister, Sudan
 Barbara Bodine, 2006, former U.S. Ambassador to Yemen
 William J. Fallon, 2008, former admiral, U.S. Navy, commander of Pacific Command and Central Command
 Hans Georg Eichler, M.D., 2010, senior medical officer at the European Medicines Agency, London
 Abbas Maleki, 2011, former Deputy Foreign Minister, Iran
 Yukio Okamoto, 2013-, adviser to the government of Japan
 Joel Brenner, 2014-, former inspector general, National Security Agency

Neuffer Fellows 
 Jackee Budesta Batanda, 2011–2012, reporter for the Global Press Institute, Uganda
 Priyanka Borpujari, 2012–2013, independent journalist based in Mumbai, India
 Prodita Sabarini, 2013–2014, reporter from the English daily The Jakarta Post, Indonesia
 Louisa Reynolds, 2014–2015, independent journalist based in Guatemala City, Guatemala
 Meera Srinivasan, 2015–2016, senior assistant editor with The Hindu

References 

 MIT CIS Facebook Page

Center for International Studies